Gregor Rajh is a Slovenian archer who participated at the 2010 Summer Youth Olympics in Singapore. He finished fourth in the boys' event, losing to Bolot Tsybzhitov of Russia in the bronze medal match. He paired up with Zoi Paraskevopoulou of Greece to win silver in the mixed team event, losing to Gloria Filippi and Anton Karoukin in the gold medal match.

References

Archers at the 2010 Summer Youth Olympics
Slovenian male archers
Living people
Year of birth missing (living people)